Spyridon Kastanis (born 23 September 1964) is a Greek racewalker. He competed in the men's 50 kilometres walk at the 2000 Summer Olympics and the 2004 Summer Olympics.

References

1964 births
Living people
Athletes (track and field) at the 2000 Summer Olympics
Athletes (track and field) at the 2004 Summer Olympics
Greek male racewalkers
Olympic athletes of Greece
Athletes from Athens